John George Nicolay (February 26, 1832 – September 26, 1901) was a German-born American author and diplomat who served as private secretary to U.S. President Abraham Lincoln and later co-authored Abraham Lincoln: A History, a biography of the 16th president. He was a member of the German branch of the Nicolay family.

Early life
He was born Johann Georg Nicolai in Essingen, Kingdom of Bavaria. In 1838, he immigrated to the United States with his father and attended school in Cincinnati, Ohio.

Career 
Nicolay moved to Illinois, where he edited the Pike County Free Press at Pittsfield, Illinois, and he became a political power in the state. Then he became assistant to the secretary of state of Illinois. While in this position, he met Abraham Lincoln and became his devoted adherent.

In 1861, Lincoln appointed Nicolay as his private secretary, which was the first official act of his new administration. Nicolay served in this capacity until Lincoln's death in 1865. Shortly before his assassination, Lincoln appointed Nicolay to a diplomatic post in France. After the death of the president, Nicolay became United States Consul at Paris, France (1865–69). For some time after his return to the United States, he edited the Chicago Republican. He was marshal of the United States Supreme Court (1872–1887). In 1881, Nicolay wrote The Outbreak of the Rebellion.

Nicolay and John Hay, who had worked with Nicolay as assistant secretary to Lincoln, collaborated on Abraham Lincoln: A History. It appeared in The Century Magazine serially from 1886 to 1890 and was issued (1890–94) in book form as 10 volumes, together with the two-volume Complete Works of Abraham Lincoln. The resulting biography is a definitive resource on Lincoln and his times. Nicolay and Hay also edited Lincoln's Works in 12 volumes (1905). Personal Traits of Abraham Lincoln was published by Helen Nicolay in 1912.

Historian Joshua M. Zeitz argues "Above all, Nicolay and Hay created a master narrative whose influence would ebb and flow over the years but that continues to command serious scrutiny and engagement." Nicolay assured Robert Todd Lincoln:
"we hold that your father was something more than a mere make-weight in the cabinet...We want to show that he formed a cabinet of strong and great men—rarely equaled in any historical era—and that he held, guided, controlled, curbed and dismissed not only them but other high officers civilian and military, at will, with perfect knowledge of men."

Nicolay was a founding member of the Literary Society of Washington in 1874, according to a book about the society written by his daughter Helen Nicolay. Both Nicolay and Hay were members of long standing in the society.

Death

Poor health had forced Nicolay to resign as Marshal of the Supreme Court, and he suffered from a wide range of ailments in his final years. He lived with his daughter Helen Nicolay at her home at 212 B Street SE in Washington, D.C. He died at home of unspecified causes on September 26, 1901. He was buried at Oak Hill Cemetery in the city.

In popular culture
In the TV series Carl Sandburg's Lincoln, aired on NBC in 1974-1976, he was portrayed by Michael Cristofer. In the 1992 documentary Lincoln, the German-born Nicolay is voiced by the Austrian-born actor Arnold Schwarzenegger. In the 1988 NBC mini-series Lincoln, based on Gore Vidal's book, Nicolay is portrayed by actor Richard Travis. In the 2012 film Lincoln, Nicolay is portrayed by Jeremy Strong. In the 2017 documentary film The Gettysburg Address, Nicolay is portrayed by actor William Fichtner.

Works 
 
 
 
 
 
 
 
 
 
 
 Campaigns of the Civil War, Volume 1: The Outbreak of Rebellion (originally published in 1881)

References

Further reading

External links

 
 
 
 
 
 Mr. Lincoln's White House: John G. Nicholay
 Truman Praises "Complete Works of Abraham Lincoln" by John G. Nicolay and John Hay Shapell Manuscript Foundation
 Mr. Lincoln and Friends: John G. Nicholay

1832 births
1910 deaths
American biographers
United States presidential advisors
German emigrants to the United States
Secretaries
Personal secretaries to the President of the United States
Lincoln administration personnel
Supreme Court of the United States people
Illinois Republicans
Washington, D.C., Republicans
19th-century American politicians
People from Pittsfield, Illinois
Historians of Abraham Lincoln
Marshals of the United States Supreme Court
Burials at Oak Hill Cemetery (Washington, D.C.)